Petrosedum is a genus of the succulent family Crassulaceae (stonecrop family).

Taxonomy
Petrosedum is a genus in the family Crassulaceae, subfamily Sempervivoideae, tribe Semperviveae, together with two other genera. It was segregated from the very large cosmopolitan and polyphyletic genus, Sedum, where it was variously considered a series (Rupestria). It was originally described with eleven species.

Species
The following species are recognised in the genus Petrosedum:
Petrosedum × affomarcoi 
Petrosedum albescens 
Petrosedum amplexicaule 
Petrosedum × bellardii 
Petrosedum × brevierei 
Petrosedum dianium 
Petrosedum × elaverinum 
Petrosedum erectum 
Petrosedum × estrelae 
Petrosedum forsterianum 
Petrosedum × henkii 
Petrosedum × hommelsii 
Petrosedum × lorenzoi 
Petrosedum × luteolum 
Petrosedum montanum 
Petrosedum monteferraticum 
Petrosedum ochroleucum 
Petrosedum orientale 
Petrosedum × pascalianum 
Petrosedum pruinatum 
Petrosedum rupestre 
Petrosedum sediforme 
Petrosedum subulatum 
Petrosedum tenuifolium

References

Bibliography

  (full text at ResearchGate)
 

Crassulaceae
Crassulaceae genera